These are the official results of the Women's Long Jump event at the 2003 World Championships in Paris, France. There were a total number of 26 participating athletes, with the final held on Saturday 30 August 2003. The qualification mark standard was set at 6.65 metres (or at least the best twelve qualified).

Medalists

Schedule
All times are Central European Time (UTC+1)

Abbreviations
All results shown are in metres

Qualification
 Held on Thursday 28 August 2003

Final

See also
2003 Long Jump Year Ranking
Athletics at the 2003 Pan American Games - Women's long jump

References
 Results (Archived 2009-05-14)
 todor66

J
Long jump at the World Athletics Championships
2003 in women's athletics